Sir Thomas Holmes Sellors  (7 April 1902 – 13 September 1987) was a British cardiothoracic surgeon.

References 

1902 births
1987 deaths
Knights Bachelor
Fellows of the Royal College of Surgeons
British thoracic surgeons
20th-century surgeons